The Black Book of Basingwerk is an illuminated manuscript in the National Library of Wales (NLW MS 7006D) containing, among other texts, a Welsh translation of Geoffrey of Monmouth's Historia Regum Britanniae. It is mostly the work of the Welsh poet and scribe Gutun Owain (fl. 1460–1500).  The illumination is limited to three decorated initials, and two marginal drawings now barely visible to the naked eye.

See also
The Form of Preaching, 14th-century-style book or manual about a preaching style

References

Illuminated manuscripts of Welsh origin
Welsh manuscripts
15th-century illuminated manuscripts